Madhyamavati (madhyamāvati) is a rāga in Carnatic music (musical scale of South Indian classical music). It is an audava rāga (or owdava rāga, meaning pentatonic scale), as it does not have all the seven musical notes (swaras). It is a janya rāga (derived scale). The equivalent of Madhyamavati in Hindustani music is Madhumad Sarang. It also has other equivalents in Hindustani music such as ragas Megh and Megh Malhar.

It is considered a very auspicious rāgam and every Carnatic music concert ends with either a song in Madhyamavati or the ending of the last song is sung in this rāgam. It is very suitable for elaboration and exploration due to even spacing of notes. The scale uses the first three notes of the cycle of fifths S, P and R2 and fourths S, M1 and N2.

Structure and Lakshana
Madhyamavati is a symmetric rāga that does not contain gāndhāram or dhaivatam. It is a pentatonic scale (audava-audava rāgam in Carnatic music classification - audava meaning 'of 5'). Its  structure (ascending and descending scale) is as follows (see swaras in Carnatic music for details on below notation and terms):

 : 
 : 

Madhyamavati is considered a janya rāga of Kharaharapriya, the 22nd Melakarta rāga, though it can be derived from other melakarta rāgas, Charukesi, Natabhairavi or Harikambhoji, by dropping both gāndhāram and dhaivatam.

Popular compositions 
Madhyamavati rāgam lends itself for extensive elaboration and exploration and has many compositions. Here are some popular kritis composed in this scale.
 Muruga enadharuyire varnam by periyasamitooran

Bhagyada Lakshmi Baaramma by Purandara Dasaru in Kannada (originally composed in Shree ragam)
Eshtu Sahasavantha, Sevakanelo naanu,  By Vadiraja Tirtha
Baro Guru Raghavendra By Shreesha Vittala Dasaru
Edurarai Guruve By Vyasatirtha
Marulu madikonde, Makutake Mangalam, Ellanu balle, Kande Kande Rajara, Indu Nanenu Sukrutava, Enu Pelali Thangi, Bandu Nintiha Nodi, Shiva Darushana  By Purandara Dasa
Tolu Tolu Ranga, An evergreen song by Purandara Dasa commonly sung in Madhyamavathi 
 Ninna Olumeinda, Vyasa Badari Nivasa By Vijaya Dasa
 Dasanagu Visheshanagu By Kanaka Dasa
Nyayiru Kayathu, Ancient Tamil Kuṟuntokai poetry by Poet Kayamanar in Sandham- Symphony Meets Classical Tamil by Composer Rajan
Vinayakuni, Nagumomu Galavaani, Rama Katha Sudha, Alakalalla, Nadupai and Muchchada brahma by Tyagaraja 
Dharma Samvardhini, mahatripurasundari mamava jagadishvari by Muthuswami Dikshitar in Sanskrit
Palinchu kamakshi by Shyama Sastri in Telugu
Kosalendra mamavamita, Bhavaye Padmanabham Iha, Sarasamukha sarasijanabha by Swathi Thirunal
Ramabhirama by Mysore Vasudevachar in Sanskrit
Sri Ramani Jaya Tribhuvana By Guru Mahipati Dasa
Sharavanabhava Guhane and Karpagame Kan by Papanasam Sivan in Tamil
Akhilanda Nayaka by Thulasivanam in Sanskrit
Sri Chamundeswarim Bhajeham Santatam by Jayachamarajendra Wodeyar in Sanskrit
Vidachi sukhimpave and  Devi parvati by Saint Gnanananda Teertha (Ogirala Veera Raghava Sarma) in Telugu
Shankari Shri Rajarajeshwari and Aadathu Asangaathu Vaa Kanna by Oothukkadu Venkata Kavi in Tamil
Marali Marali Jayamangalam, Adivo Alladivo, Choodaramma Satulala, Alara Chanchala by Annamacharya in Telugu
Santoshi Mata by Kalyani Varadarajan
Shri Parameshwaram Chinmaya tava, Shri Rama Jaya Bhuma, Shrimat Tripurasundari Amba by Muthiah Bhagavatar
Bhajamahe Shri Tripurasundari by Hari Sundareswara Sharma in Sanskrit
Vinayakuni
 Madhyamvathi (instrumental bansuri) by one of the mediators in Isha yoga center.
 Radha vadhana an ashtapati by jeyadeva

Film songs

Language:Tamil

Language:Kannada

Language:Telugu

Non-film songs

Related rāgas 
This section covers the theoretical and scientific aspect of this rāgam.

Graha bhedam 
Madhyamavati's notes when shifted using Graha bhedam, yields 4 other major pentatonic rāgas, namely, Mohanam, Hindolam, Shuddha Saveri and Udayaravichandrika (also known as Shuddha Dhanyasi). Graha bhedam is the step taken in keeping the relative note frequencies same, while shifting the shadjam to the next note in the rāga. For more details and illustration of this concept refer Graha bhedam on Mohanam.

Scale similarities 
Kedaragaula is a rāgam\ which has the ascending scale of Madhyamavati and descending scale of Harikambhoji. Its  structure is : 
Manirangu is a rāga which has gāndhāram in the descending scale, while all other notes in both the ascending and descending scale are same as Madhyamavati. Its  structure is : 
Revati is a rāga which has shuddha rishabham in place of chatushruti rishabham in the scale, while all other notes are same as Madhyamavati. Its  structure is : 
Brindāvana Sāranga is also a rāga that has some similarities in scale with Madhyamavati. Its  structure is : 
Andolika is an asymmetric rāga which has chatusruti dhaivata in place of panchama only in the descending scale, while all other notes are same as Madhyamavati. Its  structure is :

Notes

References

Janya ragas
Janya ragas (kharaharapriya)